Thutade Lake is located in the Omineca Mountains of the Northern Interior of British Columbia, Canada. The lake is at the head of the Finlay River, which joins the Peace River via Williston Lake. The largest of these is the Kemess Mine, an iron and copper property originally owned by Royal Oak Mines and now by Northgate Minerals, located in the valley of Kemess Creek, which is off the northeast end of Thutade Lake. Just downstream from the outlet of Thutade Lake, the Finlay plunges over the  Cascadero Falls, and then through a series of cataracts in a twisting course until it begins its main northeastward trend. Cascadero Falls is slated for hydroelectric development in connection with the power needs of the area's mines.

South and west of Thutade Lake lies the continental divide, across which is the watershed of the Mosque River, a tributary of the Skeena River.

History
The first European to explore the lake and its surrounding area was Samuel Black in 1824.  The upper end of the lake is the Tatlatui Range, which is astride the Continental Divide of the Americas, and which with the adjoining valley of Tatlatui Lake forms Tatlatui Provincial Park.

References

Northern Interior of British Columbia
Lakes of British Columbia
Omineca Mountains
Cassiar Land District